Emajagua is a barrio in the municipality of Maunabo, Puerto Rico with a population of 4,538 in 2010.

Features

The  Tunnel is in Emajagua.

History
Puerto Rico was ceded by Spain in the aftermath of the Spanish–American War under the terms of the Treaty of Paris of 1898 and became an unincorporated territory of the United States. In 1899, the United States Department of War conducted a census of Puerto Rico finding that the population of Emajagua barrio was 828.

Gallery

See also

 List of communities in Puerto Rico

References

Barrios of Maunabo, Puerto Rico